Senčak pri Juršincih is a settlement in the Slovene Hills in the Municipality of Juršinci in northeastern Slovenia. The area is part of the traditional region of Styria and is now included in the Drava Statistical Region.

Name
The name of the settlement was changed from Senčak to Senčak pri Juršincih in 1955.

Cultural heritage
A small chapel-shrine known as the Vrabel Shrine was built in the village after the end of the First World War.

References

External links
Senčak pri Juršincih on Geopedia

Populated places in the Municipality of Juršinci